James Williamson, FAIA is a retired architect and professor of architecture. He holds two Master of Architecture degrees from the University of Pennsylvania, where he was a student of Louis Kahn. He was subsequently an Associate with Venturi, Scott Brown Associates in Philadelphia. During some 30 years of professional practice as a partner in Williamson Pounders Architects in Memphis, he received over 30 architectural design awards at the local, regional, and national levels and saw his work published internationally. In 2008 he began a teaching career at the University of Memphis, focusing on design, history and theory at both the graduate and undergraduate levels. He is the author of two novels, "The Architect" and "The Ravine," as well as "Kahn at Penn," an analysis of Louis Kahn’s career as a teacher. Williamson was elected to the AIA College of Fellows in 2005, one of the highest honors bestowed by the American Institute of Architects. He is the recipient of the William Strickland Lifetime Achievement Award from AIA Tennessee, the Francis Gassner Award from AIA Memphis, and the AIA Edward S. Frey Award from AIA/ Interfaith Forum on Religion, Art & Architecture. In 2020 the University of Memphis held a one-man exhibit of his Italian watercolor paintings, also published in the Pennsylvania Gazette, the magazine of the University of Pennsylvania, and featured in Watercolor Artist magazine. He currently teaches continuing education courses at the University of North Carolina- Asheville.

Education:
Master of Architecture, Studio of Louis I. Kahn, Graduate School of Fine Arts, University of Pennsylvania, 1974.	
Master of Architecture, Graduate School of Fine Arts, University of Pennsylvania, 1973. 
Bachelor of Arts, Rhodes College, 1968.

Teaching: 
Osher Lifelong Learning Institute (OLLI), University of North Carolina- Asheville, volunteer instructor, 2022.
University of Memphis Department of Architecture, Full Professor with tenure, 2008-2020.
University of Memphis Department of Architecture, Adjunct Professor, 2005-2007. 
Rhodes College, Adjunct Associate Professor of Architecture, 1974-1983; 1988-2000.
Yale University School of Art and Architecture, Studio Design Critic, 1987.
University of Pennsylvania Graduate School of Fine Arts, Studio Design Critic, 1986-1988.
Drexel University, Studio Design Critic, 1986-1988.
University of Tennessee School of Architecture, Adjunct Professor, 1983-1984.
University of Pennsylvania Graduate School of Fine Arts, Graduate Teaching Fellowship,1973-1974.

Professional Practice:
Askew Nixon Ferguson Architects, Consulting Architect, Memphis, TN; 2006- 2008.
Williamson Pounders Architects, P.C., Principal, Memphis, TN; 1990- 2006.
Williamson Associates, Principal, Memphis, TN; 1988-1990.
Venturi, Scott Brown & Associates, Associate, Philadelphia, PA; 1986-1988. 
James Williamson/ Carl Awsumb/ Architects, Principal, Memphis, TN; 1980- 1986.
James F. Williamson, Architect, Principal, Memphis, TN; 1977-1980.

Selected Architectural Design Projects:
Restoration of Sacred Heart Cathedral, Rochester, NY. 
St. John's Episcopal Church, Johnson City, TN.
Restoration of the Cathedral of The Immaculate Conception, Memphis, TN.
St. Thomas More Catholic Church, Paducah, KY. 
Law Offices of Burch, Porter & Johnson, Memphis, TN.   
Ballet Memphis Headquarters, Memphis, TN.
Memphis Center City Development Plan (with Venturi, Scott Brown & Associates), Memphis, TN.
Orpheum Theater Restoration, Memphis, TN.

Selected Honors/Awards:
William Strickland Lifetime Achievement Award in recognition of a significant body of work having a lasting influence on the theory and practice of architecture - AIA Tennessee – 2017.
Francis Gassner Award for outstanding contributions to the quality of the built environment in Memphis - AIA Memphis – 2017.
Edward S. Frey Award- AIA/ Interfaith Forum on Religion, Art & Architecture – 2014.
Elected to AIA College of Fellows- American Institute of Architects – 2005.
Over 30 AIA architectural design awards at the local, regional, and national levels.

Selected Books, Articles, Films, Seminars and Lectures:
"Genius Loci", Watercolor Artist magazine, Fall 2021: sabbatical watercolor paintings.
"Hill Town: 3 Views of Todi", Pennsylvania Gazette, Nov.-Dec. 2019: sabbatical 	watercolor paintings.
Kahn at Penn by James Williamson, (Oxford, UK: Routledge, 2015); Also published in Chinese, 2018.
The Ravine, a novel by James Williamson (Santa Fe, NM: Sunstone Press, 2012).
The Architect, a novel by James Williamson (Nashville: Cold Tree Press, 2007).  
"From Silence to Light," Lillian and Morrie Moss Endowment for the Visual Arts, Fall Lecture, Rhodes College, 2015.
"Searching for Form: Louis I. Kahn at the University of Pennsylvania," invited lecture, Virginia AIA branch of the Interfaith Forum on Religion, Art and Architecture (IFRAA), Richmond, Virginia, 2015.
"Context in Architecture: Consonance, Dissonance, and Complexity," Invited lecture at Rhodes College, 2015.
"Creativity and the Unconscious: Louis I. Kahn's Teaching Legacy for Architectural Education Today," Lecture at Memphis College of Art, 2015.
“Materiality in Contemporary Religious Architecture”, Panel Moderator, Continuing Education Seminar, 2006 AlA National Convention.
“Sacred Places”, narration of film on historic Memphis churches, WKNO Television, Memphis, TN., March 2004.
“Reinterpreting the Sacred in Contemporary Religious Architecture”, Continuing Education Seminar, 2002 AlA National Convention.
“A Spiritual Path Leads to a Sacred Place”, Faith & Form, Winter 2000. 
“Sacred Places”, Presentation to AlA Tennessee, Nashville, TN, 1997.
Central Gardens Handbook, by James Williamson and Carl Awsumb, (Memphis, Central Gardens Association, 1981, 1998). 

Other:
Lieutenant (j.g.), United States Naval Reserve, 1969-1975. Eagle Scout.

American architects
Living people
Year of birth missing (living people)